Bellmere is a rural locality in the Moreton Bay Region, Queensland, Australia.

Geography
The Caboolture River forms part of the southern boundary and all of the south-eastern. Wararba Creek forms the eastern boundary before flowing into the Caboolture River in the south-east.

The D'Aguilar Highway passes to the north-east. The proposed Bruce Highway Western Alternative will pass through Bellmere from south to north.

Located to the west of the centre of Caboolture, it is essentially a suburb of that town.

History
It has been claimed that Bellmere was named after local landowner Arthur John Bell.

Bellmere State School opened on 14 July 1913 but closed in 1936.

The median age of the Bellmere population was 30 years, 7 years below the national median of 37. 76.5% of people living in Bellmere were born in Australia. The other top responses for country of birth were New Zealand 5.6%, England 4.5%, Philippines 0.8%, Korea, Republic of 0.6%, Scotland 0.5%. 89.3% of people spoke only English at home; the next most common languages were 0.7% Samoan, 0.6% Korean, 0.5% Arabic, 0.3% Tagalog, 0.3% Tongan.

A new Bellemere State School opened in January 2016. Its working title was Caboolture West State School.

Education 
Bellmere State School is a government primary (Prep-6) school for boys and girls at 176 Dobson Lane. In 2018, the school had an enrolment of 553 students with 39 teachers (35 full-time equivalent) and 24 non-teaching staff (15 full-time equivalent). It includes a special education program.

There are no secondary schools in Bellmere. The nearest government secondary schools are Tullawong State High School in neighbouring Caboolture to the north-east and Morayfield State High School in Morayfield to the south-east.

References

External links

 
 BellmereWeather.net Live weather in Bellmere

Suburbs of Moreton Bay Region
Localities in Queensland